Uranothauma antinorii, the blue heart or Antinori's branded blue, is a butterfly in the family Lycaenidae. It is found in Nigeria, Cameroon, the Democratic Republic of the Congo, Ethiopia, Uganda, Rwanda, Burundi, Kenya, Tanzania, Zambia, Malawi, Mozambique and Zimbabwe. The habitat consists of edges of submontane forests.

Adult males are attracted to damp patches and have been recorded on carnivore scat. Both sexes feed from small flowers. Adults are on wing in summer.

Subspecies
Uranothauma antinorii antinorii (highlands Ethiopia)
Uranothauma antinorii bamendanus Libert, 1993 (Nigeria, highlands Cameroon)
Uranothauma antinorii felthami (Stevenson, 1934) (Kenya: west and the central highlands, Uganda, Tanzania, Democratic Republic of the Congo: Lualaba and Shaba, northern Zambia, Malawi, Mozambique, eastern Zimbabwe)

References

Butterflies described in 1883
Uranothauma
Butterflies of Africa
Taxa named by Charles Oberthür